The Institute for Advanced Studies in the Humanities (IASH, University of Edinburgh) was founded in 1969 at the University of Edinburgh, for visiting fellows to engage in study and research in the arts, humanities and social sciences. The current Director (since 2022) is Lesley McAra. Other Directors have included David Daiches, Susan Manning, Jo Shaw and Steve Yearley.

Since 1969, IASH has received visits from over 1,300 fellows. Up to 25 Fellows are in residence at any one time, and visits last between two months and ten months. Each year IASH hosts the University of Edinburgh's annual Fulbright-Scotland Visiting Professorship. Notable former Fellows include Marianne Boruch, William C. Dowling, Sébastien Fath, Ruth Barcan Marcus, Edward Mendelson, Garry Wills, and Charles W.J. Withers.

IASH hosts or organises over 100 events per year.

The IASH Advisory Board  includes Rosi Braidotti and Allan Little. It is chaired by Sarah Prescott.

IASH's premises are located in Hope Park Square off Meadow Lane in Edinburgh.

References

External links
 http://www.iash.ed.ac.uk/

University of Edinburgh
Humanities education